William James College, formerly Massachusetts School of Professional Psychology (MSPP), is a private college of psychology in Newton, Massachusetts. With more than 750 students, William James College offers graduate academic degree and certificate programs across four departments: Clinical Psychology, Counseling Psychology, Organizational and Leadership Psychology, and School Psychology, as well as a Bachelor of Science completion program in Psychology and Human Services.

Educational approach

Founded in 1974, William James College uses an experiential education model, which combines academic instruction with supervised clinical experience.  Students are in the field beginning in the first year, and are placed in various local field facilities including social service agencies, schools, hospitals, community mental health centers, child guidance clinics, court clinics, college counseling centers, private agencies and corporate settings.

Specialty areas

The Lucero Latino Mental Health Training Program is a concentration open to students from many of the graduate programs, specializing in the specific mental health needs of Latino patients or clients.  The Dr. Cynthia Lucero Center, which sponsors the concentration in Latino Mental Health, was founded by the friends and family of the late Dr. Cynthia Lucero, a graduate of William James College. Lectures and scholarships in Cynthia's memory are also sponsored by the Lucero Center. The academic concentration provides relevant coursework and summer immersion programs in Costa Rica and Ecuador focused on improving Spanish language skills and exposure to Latino cultures through community service mental health work.

One distinguishing William James College program is designed to "train vets to treat vets". In 2011, William James College was awarded a grant from the Commonwealth of Massachusetts, working to recruit veterans and train them to meet the mental health needs of their fellow service men and women.  William James College participates in the Veteran's Administration Yellow Ribbon Program and provides matching grant assistance to eligible veterans.

The Center for Multicultural and Global Mental Health (CMGMH) aims to be a preeminent academic, clinical training, and research center in promoting social justice and addressing mental health disparities among disenfranchised populations in the U.S. and abroad.  It houses the Latino Mental Health Program (LMHP), the African and Caribbean Mental Health (ACMH) Program, and the Global Mental Health (GMH) Program.

William James College is also home to the Black Mental Health Graduate Academy, an emerging academic pipeline program designed to recruit, mentor, and support Black students in Master's and Doctoral degree programs for mental health counseling and psychology.

Academics
The college offers the PsyD, MA and BS degrees as well as several certificates.

Continuing and community education
William James College offers continuing education opportunities in a variety of formats. Professional continuing education is available for psychologists, social workers, nurses, mental health counselors, school psychologists, counselors, other mental health professionals, educators, businessmen and women, psychotherapists, and the community.

In addition, the Freedman Center for Child and Family Development offers courses for parents.

Accreditation

William James College is accredited by the New England Commission of Higher Education (formerly New England Association of Schools and Colleges (NEASC))).

The Clinical Psychology Doctoral Program, the School Psychology Doctoral Program and the exclusive William James College APA internship consortium are accredited by the American Psychological Association (APA).

The MA/CAGS and PsyD in School Psychology are approved by the National Association of School Psychologists (NASP).

The Behavior Analyst Certification Board, Inc has verified the William James College Applied Behavior Analysis course sequence as meeting the coursework requirements for eligibility to take the Board Certified Behavior Analyst Examination.

Centers and programs
William James College is home to the following centers and programs:
 Center of Excellence for Children, Families, and the Law;
 Center for Multicultural & Global Mental Health ;
 Dr. Leon O. Brenner Center for Psychological Assessment and Testing;
 Freedman Center for Child and Family Development;
 Lucero Center for Latino Mental Health,
 Alliance for Aging
 Leadership Learning Hub
 Human Trafficking Research Hub
 Juvenile Court Clinic Operations
 PATHWAYS program

References

External links
 

Universities and colleges in Boston
Private universities and colleges in Massachusetts